Khpyuk is a rural locality (a selo) in Suleyman-Stalsky District, Republic of Dagestan, Russia. The population was 227 as of 2010. There are 3 streets.

Geography 
Khpyuk is located 21 km west of Kasumkent (the district's administrative centre) by road. Kachalkent is the nearest rural locality.

References 

Rural localities in Suleyman-Stalsky District